Ezekiel Machogu Ombaki (born 1 January 1956) is a Kenyan politician who is currently serving as the Cabinet Secretary for the Ministry of Education after being nominated by President William Ruto.

Early life and education 
Ombaki attended Nduru High School and later completed his O-levels at Agoro Sare Secondary School in 1975. In 1976 to 1979 he attended the University of Nairobi where he earned a Bachelor of Arts in Business Administration.

Career 
Ombaki started his career in the office of the president as a District Officer, where he worked from 1976 to 1979. He later became a District Commissioner, an office he left in 2008. He served as a Senior Deputy Secretary in the public service commission until 2016. In 2017 he entered the National Assembly as a Member of Parliament from Nyaribari Masaba Constituency. Ombaki was a member of the Committee on Regional Integration and the Members Services and Facilities Committee while in Parliament.

References 

Living people
1956 births
Kenyan politicians